Crimson Mask may refer to:

 Crimson Mask (character), a fictional character from Thrilling Publications
 Crimson mask, a professional wrestling term to describe a wrestler's face being covered in his own blood, most often due to blading
 Crimson Mask (novel), a crime novel by W. H. Lane Crauford